Samuel Joseph Ellis (February 11, 1941 – May 13, 2016) was an American professional baseball pitcher. He played in Major League Baseball (MLB) for the Cincinnati Reds, California Angels, and Chicago White Sox. Ellis was an MLB All-Star in 1965.

College career
Born in Youngstown, Ohio, Ellis was signed by the Cincinnati Reds as an amateur free agent in 1961 after playing college baseball at Mississippi State University (MSU) for the Mississippi State Bulldogs. At Mississippi State, he lettered one year (1961) with a pitching record of 12–7, leading the team in strikeouts (73) and innings pitched (57). He was named to MSU's Athletics Hall of Fame in 2012.

Professional career
Ellis made his major league debut at the start of the 1962 season. His first appearance was on April 14, 1962, which he lost. His first victory came 10 days later on April 24, when he walked 11 batters but only allowed one hit. After spending part of the 1962 and all of the 1963 season in the minors, Ellis rejoined the major league club in 1964 as a reliever. He finished the season with a 10–3 record, a 2.57 earned run average (ERA), pitched 52 games, and threw fewer walks in those 52 games (28) than he did in 1962 in 8 games (29).

In 1965, Ellis made his only All-Star appearance. He won 22 games, including 15 complete starts and two shutouts, while posting an ERA of 3.79. He led the major leagues with 111 earned runs allowed. His walk total was down in 1966, but he finished the season with a 12–19 record, and also led the league in home runs allowed (35) and earned runs allowed (130). He remained part of the starting pitching rotation in 1967 and brought his ERA back down under 4.00.

After the 1967 season, on November 29, 1967, Ellis was traded to the California Angels for pitchers Bill Kelso and Jorge Rubio. He played in California for one season, where his role was mixed. He started 24 games, but also worked some games in relief and notched two saves. On January 20, 1969, Ellis was traded to the Chicago White Sox for right fielder Bill Voss and minor leaguer Andy Rubilotta. Ellis was traded again in June, this time to the Cleveland Indians for pitcher Jack Hamilton. However, he was sent to the minors, ending up with the Tulsa Oilers in 1970 and the Birmingham A's in 1971, and was unable to make it back to the majors.

Coaching career
After retiring, Ellis worked as a Major League pitching coach for a dozen seasons, having stints with the New York Yankees (1982–84; 1986), Chicago White Sox (1989–91), Chicago Cubs (1992), Seattle Mariners (1993–94), Boston Red Sox (1996) and Baltimore Orioles (2000). Sinkerball pitcher Tommy John credited Ellis with helping him work out some problems with his delivery in 1982. After watching John throw for 40 to 50 minutes a day for several days, Ellis observed, "I always recall seeing you pitch with your hand laid back like you're gonna throw a pie." John adjusted his delivery accordingly and began pitching better.

Death
Ellis was a long time resident of Temple Terrace, Florida, where he died from cancer on May 13, 2016, at the age of 75.

References

External links
 or Baseball Almanac or Retrosheet or Venezuelan Professional Baseball League

1941 births
2016 deaths
Baltimore Orioles coaches
Baseball players from Youngstown, Ohio
Birmingham A's players
Boston Red Sox coaches
California Angels players
Deaths from cancer in Florida
Chicago Cubs coaches
Chicago White Sox coaches
Chicago White Sox players
Cincinnati Reds players
Columbia Reds players
Indianapolis Indians players
Leones del Caracas players
American expatriate baseball players in Venezuela
Major League Baseball pitchers
Major League Baseball pitching coaches
Mississippi State Bulldogs baseball players
National League All-Stars
New York Yankees coaches
Portland Beavers players
San Diego Padres (minor league) players
Seattle Mariners coaches
Tulsa Oilers (baseball) players
People from Temple Terrace, Florida